Broken Embraces is a 2009 Spanish romantic thriller film written, produced, and directed by Pedro Almodóvar. Led by an ensemble cast consisting of many Almodóvar regulars, it stars Lluís Homar as a blind Madrilenian screenwriter who recalls his tragic love for Lena, played by Penélope Cruz, the deceased lead actress in his last directional feature Girls and Suitcases, who was also the mistress of a powerful, obsessive businessman (José Luis Gómez). Blanca Portillo co-stars as his agent Judit, while Tamar Novas portrays her son and Caine's co-writer Diego.

Inspired by darkness and by a photo of a couple that Almodóvar took of El Golfo beach in Lanzarote in the late 1990s, the film serves as an homage to filmmaking, cinema and its various film genres. Stylistically, it is a complex noir-ish melodrama, that also blends comic elements with a film within a film—a broad comedy, that hearkens back to Almodóvar's 1988 release, Women on the Verge of a Nervous Breakdown. Thematically, Broken Embraces addresses themes like voyeurism, repression, prostitution, death, vengeance, fixation, illness, and drugs.

Broken Embraces was one of the films competing for the Palme d'Or at the 2009 Cannes Film Festival. Dubbed "purest Almodóvar" by The New Yorker, the film was noted for the director's characteristic "bright primary colors," erotic subject matter, and meticulous, "visually pulsating" cinematography. The picture was nominated for Best Foreign Language Film at both the 2009 British Academy Film Awards and the 67th Golden Globe Awards.

Plot
"Harry Caine" is a blind writer who shares his life with his agent Judit and her adult son, Diego. Slowly, events in the present begin to bring back memories of the past. Harry hears that millionaire Ernesto Martel has died; a young filmmaker, Ray X, appears and turns out to be Martel's son, Ernesto Jr. After Diego is hospitalized for an accidental drug overdose in a Madrid nightclub, Harry collects Diego from the hospital and looks after him to avoid worrying his traveling mother. The main storyline is told in flashback as Harry reluctantly tells Diego a tragic tale of fate, jealousy, abuse of power, betrayal, and guilt.

The first flashback is to 1992, which introduces Magdalena "Lena" Rivero, Martel's beautiful young secretary, an aspiring actress. She becomes close to Martel, a millionaire financier, in order to find the money to help meet her dying father's medical bills. By 1994, she has become Martel's mistress. At this time, Harry is still living under his real name, Mateo Blanco, a well-respected film director. Martel is excessively possessive of Lena, but she is determined to become an actress and manages to win the main role in Blanco's film Chicas y maletas (Girls and Suitcases) by bringing Martel in as financier/producer. (The fictional film is similar to Almodóvar's 1988 release, Women on the Verge of a Nervous Breakdown, except that the Shiite terrorists have been replaced by a cocaine dealer; several of the cast of the previous film appear in the fictional one.) Martel spies on Lena and Mateo by sending his inhibited, effeminate gay son, Ernesto Jr., to videotape the production of the film, ostensibly for a "making of" feature, then hiring a lip-reader to interpret the conversations. Martel, seething with jealousy, screens the videos as the lip-reader narrates the furtive whispers of Lena and Mateo's passionate affair.

Furious, Martel confronts Lena, and when she threatens to leave him, he pushes her down the stairs. But when she survives the fall, he relents and nurses her back to health. The filming completed, Lena and Blanco escape Martel's hold and go on holiday to Lanzarote. Lena takes a job as a hotel receptionist to pass the time. When she and Blanco read in El País that Chicas y maletas has received terrible reviews from critics, likely the end of Blanco's directing career, they decide to start over again together far from Madrid. Fate intervenes when Blanco is seriously injured and Lena is killed in a car accident, which is immortalized by Ernesto Jr., who has been trailing them with his camcorder. Mateo loses his sight permanently. Judit, his long-time production assistant, and an 8-year-old Diego arrive to help Blanco pick up the pieces and return to Madrid, where he eventually writes screenplays in braille under the pseudonym Harry Caine, represented by his agent, Judit.

The story picks up where it began in 2008: Harry shares his birthday in a bar with Judit and Diego. Judit becomes drunk on gin and, stricken with guilt, confesses to Harry that she sold out to Martel in 1994 because of her fury at Harry for abandoning the film to run away with Lena; she also tells him of her involvement in providing Martel the phone number of the hotel in Lanzarote where Lena and Mateo were hiding. She confirms that Martel sabotaged the release of Chicas y maletas by using the worst take from each scene in order to destroy Mateo's reputation. The next morning, she reveals to Diego that Harry is actually his father, a fact both men were unaware of. Having exorcised some of his demons, Harry decides to return to his life as Mateo Blanco. Though believed lost, the original reels of Chicas y maletas and Ernesto Jr.'s camcorder footage are recovered: Judit had ignored Martel's order to destroy them and instead had hidden them away. Mateo and Diego re-edit the film for its long-delayed release as the director envisioned it.

Cast

Reception

The film has received generally positive reviews by critics; review aggregator website Rotten Tomatoes reported that 82% of critics gave the film a positive rating, based on 158 reviews. Its consensus states "Pedro Almodóvar's fourth film with Penélope Cruz isn't his finest work, but he brings his signature visual brilliance to this noirish tale, and the cast turns in some first-class performances." It currently holds a score of 76 (generally favorable reviews) on Metacritic. Chicago Sun-Times film critic Roger Ebert gave the film four out of four stars, and wrote that "Broken Embraces is a voluptuary of a film, drunk on primary colors, caressing Penélope Cruz, using the devices of a Hitchcock to distract us with surfaces while the sinister uncoils beneath." The Guardian included the film in its "Top 10 films of 2009" list.

The film was accepted into the main selection at the 2009 Cannes Film Festival in competition for the prestigious Palme d'Or, Almodóvar's third to do so, and fourth to screen at the festival. Broken Embraces was nominated for the 2010 Golden Globe Award for Best Foreign Language Film, Almodóvar's sixth film to be nominated in this category. It was also nominated for the Satellite Award for Best Foreign Language Film, as well as the Satellite Award for Best Actress for Penélope Cruz's performance.

Accolades

Soundtrack
The film includes an original soundtrack album composed entirely by Alberto Iglesias, which was released in Spain on CD format to coincide with the film's release. The film also includes two English tracks from American artists: "Robot Oeuf" by Uffie, and a cover of Michael Hurley's "Werewolf" by Cat Power.

See also 
 List of Spanish films of 2009

References

External links
 
 
 
 
 

2009 films
2009 LGBT-related films
2009 romantic drama films
2009 thriller drama films
2000s English-language films
2000s romantic thriller films
2000s Spanish-language films
El Deseo films
English-language Spanish films
Films about filmmaking
Films about infidelity
Films directed by Pedro Almodóvar
Films produced by Agustín Almodóvar
Films scored by Alberto Iglesias
Films set in the 1990s
Films set in the 2000s
Films shot in the Canary Islands
Films shot in Madrid
LGBT-related romantic drama films
LGBT-related thriller drama films
Spanish LGBT-related films
Spanish nonlinear narrative films
Spanish romantic drama films
Spanish romantic thriller films
Spanish thriller drama films
2000s Spanish films
Films about disability
2009 multilingual films
Spanish multilingual films